is a Japanese football player.

Club statistics
Updated to 23 February 2018.

References

External links
Profile at Tochigi SC

1990 births
Living people
Association football people from Saitama Prefecture
Japanese footballers
J1 League players
J2 League players
J3 League players
Kashiwa Reysol players
Fagiano Okayama players
AC Nagano Parceiro players
Tochigi SC players
Gainare Tottori players
Association football midfielders